Raja Perempuan Zainab II binti Almarhum Tengku Sri Utama Raja Tengku Muhammad Petra (Jawi: راج ڤرمڤوان زينب ٢ بنت المرحوم تڠكو سري اوتام راج تڠكو محمد ڤيترا; 7 August 1917 – 10  January 1993) was the Raja Perempuan (Queen Consort) of Kelantan. She also served as Raja Permaisuri Agong of Malaysia from 20 September 1975 to 29 March 1979.

Born on 7 August 1917 in Kota Bharu, Kelantan, she was the consort of Sultan Yahya Petra and the mother of the 28th Sultan of Kelantan, HRH Sultan Ismail Petra.

Marriage and Becoming Queen
Tengku Zainab, daughter of Almarhum Tengku Sri Utama Raja Tengku Muhammad Petra and Almarhumah Tengku Maharani Putri Tengku Kembang Petri, married Sultan Yahya Petra ibni Almarhum Sultan Ibrahim Petra of Kelantan on 4 June 1939, who at the time held the title of Tengku Temenggong.

She was given the title Tengku Ampuan Mahkota (conferred on the consort of the Crown Prince) by Sultan Ibrahim on 9 August 1956. On the same day she was conferred the S.P.M.K. Order.

In 1960, Sultan Yahya became Sultan and his wife was proclaimed Raja Perempuan or Queen. She took the title of “Raja Perempuan Zainab II” as her stepmother-in-law was also known as Raja Perempuan Zainab. Tengku Zainab was conferred the Darjah Kerabat (D.K. – Royal Family Order) on the first anniversary of Sultan Yahya Petra’s installation.

She served as Raja Permaisuri Agong of Malaysia during her husband's reign as Yang di-Pertuan Agong from 1975 to 1979.

On his death on 29 March 1979, she returned to Kelantan where she guided her only son, Sultan Ismail Petra, in the performance of his duties.

Duties and Interests

Tengku Zainab accompanied Sultan Yahya Petra on his official visits to several countries which gave her the opportunity to fulfill her responsibility as the Raja Perempuan and the Raja Permaisuri Agong. 

Tengku Zainab was a kind person who loved doing charity work. She was once the president of various social organisations such as the Girl Guides of Kelantan and the Women’s Institution.

Tengku Zainab gave special attention to ‘house-keeping’ such as decorating the palace and preparing food for the royal family. She also loved doing handicraft, collecting antiques and gardening.

Death
Tengku Zainab died  on 10 January 1993 at the State Palace at the age of 75. She was laid to rest at the Kelantan Royal Mausoleum.

Awards and recognitions

Honours of Kelantan  
  Knight Grand Commander of the Order of the Crown of Kelantan (SPMK) - Dato' (9 August 1956)
  Recipient of the Royal Family Order of Kelantan (DK) (10 July 1960)

Honours of Malaysia 
  Recipient of the Order of the Crown of the Realm (DMN) (28 February 1976)

Places named after her 
Several places named after her, including:
Raja Perempuan Zainab II Mosque in Kubang Kerian, Kota Bharu, Kelantan
Jalan Raja Perempuan Zainab II (Federal Route 131) in Kubang Kerian, Kota Bharu, Kelantan
Raja Perempuan Zainab II Hospital in Kota Bharu, Kelantan
SK Zainab (1), a primary school in Kota Bharu, Kelantan
SK Zainab (2), a primary school in Kota Bharu, Kelantan
SMK Zainab (1), a secondary school in Kota Bharu, Kelantan
SMK Zainab (2), a secondary school in Kota Bharu, Kelantan

See also
 Yang Di-Pertuan Agong
 Raja Permaisuri Agong

References

1917 births
1993 deaths
Malaysian people of Malay descent
Malaysian Muslims
Royal House of Kelantan
Kelantan royal consorts
Malaysian royal consorts
People from Kelantan
Malaysian queens consort
Recipients of the Order of the Crown of the Realm